Koundi et le jeudi national is a 2010 documentary film.

Synopsis 
Koundi is a large village with around 1,200 inhabitants, located in Cameroon's East Province. Aware of Koundi's richness in timber, the villagers decide to use it to alleviate poverty. They organise a union, the Organisation for Communal Interests, and create a cocoa plantation over several hectares to be able to depend on themselves. They also institute "National Thursday": Once a month, they all work on the development of the cocoa plantation. Village life is shown through the prism of self-management.

Awards 
 Dubai 2010
 Griot de Ébano FCAT 2011

External links 

2010 films
Cameroonian documentary films
2010 documentary films
Documentary films about agriculture
Cocoa production
Best Documentary Africa Movie Academy Award winners
Agriculture in Cameroon